Julia Sergeyevna Novikova (née Sedina; born November 9, 1980) is a Russian orienteering competitor. She was member of the Russian relay team that received a silver medal in the 2008 European Orienteering Championships, together with Natalia Korzhova and Tatiana Ryabkina.

Novikova is the second best Russian woman behind Riabkina. She is normally very safe on the first leg in relays.

References

External links

1980 births
Living people
Russian orienteers
Female orienteers
Foot orienteers
World Orienteering Championships medalists
World Games gold medalists
Competitors at the 2009 World Games
World Games medalists in orienteering
21st-century Russian women
Junior World Orienteering Championships medalists